Robert Edward Machado (born October 16, 1973) is an Australian-born American professional surfer.

Early life 
Machado attended San Dieguito High School.  He describes himself in interviews, vlogs and social media as a "soul surfer," or freesurfer,. He was largely active in the competitive surfing scene from 1993 to 2000, and was still competing in World Surf League events until 2012.

Career
Machado hosts and participates in an annual event held at his home reef called the Rob Machado Surf Classic and Beach Fair, which is an amateur competition for the locals of all ages, and it includes demo sessions with Machado and other pros.

Machado portrayed "himself" in the 2007 animated picture, Surf's Up. Machado also starred in his own feature film released in the late 90s titled "Drifting". Additionally, Rob wrote and starred in the 2009 film, The Drifter.

Machado is a 2011 inductee into the Surfing Walk of Fame in Huntington Beach, California in the surf champion category.

On December 31, 2019, Machado announced he would no longer be associated with Hurley International after having been sponsored by the surf company for nearly 20 years, due to the new ownership group's desire to cut spending. He is now sponsored by Vuori, Reef, Dragon and Firewire.

Environmental activism 
Machado formed the Rob Machado Foundation, an organization focused on environmental causes.

Career highlights 
Machado has won the Hawaii's Pipeline Masters (Triple Crown of Surfing), and the U.S. Open of Surfing, the largest surfing event held on the U.S. mainland.

References

External links
 Official website

1973 births
Living people
Sportspeople from Sydney
American surfers
American people of Australian descent
American sportspeople of Mexican descent
World Surf League surfers